Anthrax is an acute disease caused by the bacterium Bacillus anthracis.

Anthrax may also refer to:

 Bacillus anthracis, the bacterium responsible for anthrax, the disease
 Anthrax toxin, the virulent proteins secreted by Bacillus anthracis
 2001 anthrax attacks in the US
 Anthrax (fly), a genus of bombyliid flies
 Anthrax (American band), an American thrash metal band formed in 1981
 "Anthrax", a song by that band from their album Fistful of Metal
 Anthrax (British band), a British anarcho-punk band formed in 1980
 Anthrax, a fictional character seen in the video game Shrek SuperSlam
 Anthrax (2001 film), starring David Keith
 Castle Anthrax, a fictional fortress in the movie Monty Python and the Holy Grail
 Los Ántrax, a Mexican gang